Ben Paton (born 19 October 1998) is a professional Australian rules footballer playing for  in the Australian Football League (AFL).

Paton is from Tallangatta. In 2015, he played 18 games in the Tallangatta & District Football League for Mitta United aged 16, winning their best and fairest. Paton played for the Murray Bushrangers in the TAC Cup in 2016, and was in their losing grand final team. He also played for North Albury. Although eligible for the 2016 AFL draft, Paton was not invited to the AFL Draft Combine that year. In 2017, he returned to the Bushrangers and moved from the midfield to defence. Paton played for Vic Country in the 2017 AFL Under 18 Championships and was selected in the All-Australian side. Paton was recruited by St Kilda with pick 46 in the 2017 national draft.

In 2018, Paton played for St Kilda's VFL affiliate Sandringham. He suffered a thumb injury in a practice match against the Northern Blues; he was expected to miss about six weeks. Paton was named as an emergency 10 times before he was selected in the senior side against  in round 21. On debut, he kicked one goal from a set shot. Coach Alan Richardson praised Paton after the match for his speed and foot skills. He signed a one-year contract extension, keeping him at St Kilda until 2020, after playing the remaining two matches of the season.

Paton's father Steve played 190 games for North Albury and captained the club for six seasons.

References

External links 

Living people
1998 births
Murray Bushrangers players
North Albury Football Club players
Sandringham Football Club players
St Kilda Football Club players
Australian rules footballers from Victoria (Australia)